The football tournament at the 1986 Central American Games was held in Guatemala City, Guatemala from 4 to 10 January.  El Salvador, Honduras and Nicaragua were invited to enter their U-21 teams to play in the tournament along with hosts Guatemala.  The tournament also served as a qualification to the 1986 Central American and Caribbean Games held in Santo Domingo, Dominican Republic.

Teams

Squads

Venue

Final ranking

Results

References

1986